Orthoglymma is a genus of endemic New Zealand ground beetle in the Gondwanan subtribe Nothobroscina. There is a single species, Orthoglymma wangapeka.

Description

References 

Liebherr, J. K., Marris, J. W., Emberson, R. M., Syrett, P., & Roig‐Juñent, S. (2011). Orthoglymma wangapeka gen. n., sp. n.(Coleoptera: Carabidae: Broscini): a newly discovered relict from the Buller Terrane, north‐western South Island, New Zealand, corroborates a general pattern of Gondwanan endemism. Systematic Entomology, 36(3), 395-414.

Nothobroscina
Monotypic Carabidae genera
Insects described in 2011
Insects of New Zealand